The flora of the Republic of North Macedonia is represented with around 210 families, 920 genera, and around 3,700 plant species. The most abundant group are the flowering plants with around 3,200 species, which is followed by mosses (350 species) and ferns (42).

Phytogeographically, North Macedonia belongs to the Illyrian province of the Circumboreal Region within the Boreal Kingdom. According to the WWF and Digital Map of European Ecological Regions by the European Environment Agency, the territory of the Republic can be subdivided into four ecoregions: the Pindus Mountains mixed forests, Balkan mixed forests, Rhodopes mixed forests and Aegean sclerophyllous and mixed forests.

Numerical distribution of plant families, genera and species 

All the genera and species of plants found in North Macedonia are presented in "Flora of the Republic of Macedonia" (Macedonian Флора на Република Македонија) by Academic d-r Kiril Micevski, one of the founders of the botanical science in North Macedonia.